Liolaemus audituvelatus is a species of lizard in the family  Liolaemidae. It is native to Chile.

References

audituvelatus
Reptiles described in 1983
Reptiles of Chile
Endemic fauna of Chile